The 2021–22 Southern Utah Thunderbirds men's basketball team represented Southern Utah University in the 2021–22 NCAA Division I men's basketball season. The Thunderbirds, led by sixth-year head coach Todd Simon, played their home games at the America First Event Center in Cedar City, Utah as members of the Big Sky Conference. They finished the season 23–12, 14–6 in Big Sky play to finish in second place. They lost in the quarterfinals of the Big Sky tournament to Portland State. They received an invitation to The Basketball Classic tournament where they defeated Kent State, UTEP, and Portland to advance to the tournament semifinals. There they lost to Fresno State. 

The season was the program's last as members of the Big Sky with the school announcing that the Thunderbirds will join the Western Athletic Conference in 2022.

Previous season
In a season limited due to the ongoing COVID-19 pandemic, the Thunderbirds finished the 2020–21 season 20–4, 12–2 in Big Sky play to finish as Big Sky regular season champions. They defeated Northern Colorado in the quarterfinals of the Big Sky tournament, before being upset in overtime in the semifinals by Montana State.

Roster

Schedule and results

|-
!colspan=12 style=| Regular season

|-
!colspan=9 style=| Big Sky tournament

|-
!colspan=9 style=| The Basketball Classic

Sources

References

Southern Utah Thunderbirds men's basketball seasons
Southern Utah Thunderbirds
Southern Utah Thunderbirds men's basketball
Southern Utah Thunderbirds men's basketball
Southern Utah